Bhakkar, is the principal city of Bhakkar District located in Punjab, Pakistan. It lies on the left bank of the Indus River. It is the 86th largest city in Pakistan.it is very famous for its mustard oil.it has a famous park named as dilkushabagh.it is important for historical pov.

Administration
Bhakkar city is also the administrative centre of Bhakkar Tehsil one of the four tehsils of the district. Bhakkar Tehsil is subdivided into 17 union councils, three of which form the city of Bhakkar.

History 
Bhakkar was founded probably towards the close of the fifteenth century by a group of colonists from Dera Ismail Khan. During the 15th century, Bhakkar saw a struggle for power between Hassan Malik and Naveed Asghar. It came under Humayun's rule after he restored the Mughal empire and he appointed Khan Khanan as the governor of the city alongside Multan, as Multan was a province of the Mughal empire that included the city of Bhakkar. it is on the name of Bakhar Khan.

Fray Sebastian Manrique, a 17th-century traveller, travelled to this city in 1641 and described it as the capital of a Kingdom of Bhakkar.

British rule 
During British rule, Bhakkar Town was part of Bhakkar tehsil of Mianwali District. It was located on the left bank of the Indus River and was on the North-Western Railway line.
 
The Imperial Gazetteer of India described the town as follows:

Places to Visit

Dilkusha Bagh

There is an Old Date Orchard, locally known as 'Dilkusha Bagh' which is believed by some to be a Mughal garden built by Humayun, however Humayun never visited the area, on his retreat to Iran, he went to another Bakhar in Sindh to seek help from Mahmood Khan, which was however denied by historian Henry Raverty.

Famous things of Bhakkar

Tail Karna
The flower is used in a multitude of ways, but the most common is to make oil. Its essence is extracted and added to mustard oil while cloves, cardamom, jasmine and other spices are also added to the mixture. The resulting product is called ‘karna oil’ and is thought to be a quality product for treating a wide array of hair related issues such as dandruff and unnecessary shedding.

Notable people 
 Malik Ghulam Yasin Chhina (lawyer and social worker)
 Rasheed Akbar Khan Nawani (political person)
 Muhammad Zafar Ullah Khan Dhandla (political person)

References

Bibliography

External links 
 

Populated places in Bhakkar District
Cities in Punjab (Pakistan)
Bhakkar District